Wang Yuzeng (10 April 1912 – 7 October 2009) was a Chinese basketball player. He competed in the men's tournament at the 1936 Summer Olympics.

References

External links

1912 births
2009 deaths
Chinese men's basketball players
Olympic basketball players of China
Basketball players at the 1936 Summer Olympics
Basketball players from Hebei
Sportspeople from Baoding
Republic of China men's national basketball team players